The Hollywood Turf Express Handicap is an American Thoroughbred horse race run annually during the second half of November at Hollywood Park Racetrack in Inglewood, California. Formerly a Grade III event raced at a distance of six furlongs on turf, it is open to horses age three and older. The race was not eligible for grading in 2011. The race currently offers a purse of $150,000.

There was no race run in 2005 due to condition problems with the Hollywood Park turf course.

In 2013, there was a triple dead-heat for second place between No Silent, Chips All In, and Unbridled's Note. The race was won by Boat Trip.

Winners since 1999

References

 The Hollywood Turf Express Handicap at Pedigree Query
 The 2007 Hollywood Turf Express Handicap at the NTRA

Horse races in California
Hollywood Park Racetrack
Turf races in the United States
Open sprint category horse races
Ungraded stakes races in the United States